Heteroteucha rhoecozona is a moth in the family Oecophoridae. It was described by Turner in 1946. It is found in Australia, where it has been recorded from New South Wales.

The wingspan is about 16 mm. The forewings are pale yellow with fuscous markings. There is a narrow transverse fascia from the costa before the middle to the mid-dorsum, strongly bent in the middle to form a posterior angle. There is also a narrow terminal fascia. The hindwings are pale grey.

References

Moths described in 1946
Heteroteucha